Stylidium rupestre is a dicotyledonous plant that belongs to the genus Stylidium (family Stylidiaceae), a species sometimes named as the rock triggerplant. It is found in Southwest Australia. The species was first described by Otto Wilhelm Sonder.

See also 
 List of Stylidium species

References 

Carnivorous plants of Australia
Eudicots of Western Australia
rupestre
Asterales of Australia
Taxa named by Otto Wilhelm Sonder